Bill Owen was the head baseball coach at the University of Oklahoma from 1923 until 1926. During his tenure, the Sooners won 42 games and two conference championships. Owen was the brother of Bennie Owen who served as the Sooners head football and men's basketball coach.

Head coaching record

References

Oklahoma Sooners baseball coaches
Year of death missing
Year of birth missing